Great Women Masters of Art is a 2003 reference work assembled and edited by the art historian Jordi Vigué, on women painters through the ages.

The preface of the book declares its motivation to fill the "lagoons of oblivion and contradicting opinions" regarding women's art. It confesses immediately the difficulties of handling such a broad subject, but after a short overview of women painters through the ages, it settles on the following list of women, where each entry includes a few illustrations:

List of women in the book

References

 2003 review on Foreword Magazine website

Lists of painters
2003 non-fiction books
Lists of women artists
Biographical dictionaries of women
Books about women
Women painters
2003 in art